The 1985 Tour de France was the 72nd edition of Tour de France, one of cycling's Grand Tours. The Tour began in Plumelec with a prologue individual time trial on 28 June and Stage 12 occurred on 10 July with a mountainous stage from Morzine. The race finished on the Champs-Élysées in Paris on 21 July.

Stage 12
10 July 1985 — Morzine to Lans-en-Vercors,

Stage 13
11 July 1985 — Villard-de-Lans,  (individual time trial)

Stage 14
13 July 1985 — Autrans to Saint-Étienne,

Stage 15
14 July 1985 — Saint-Étienne to Aurillac,

Stage 16
15 July 1985 — Aurillac to Toulouse,

Stage 17
16 July 1985 — Toulouse to Luz Ardiden,

Stage 18a
17 July 1985 — Luz-Saint-Sauveur to Aubisque,

Stage 18b
17 July 1985 — Laruns to Pau,

Stage 19
18 July 1985 — Pau to Bordeaux,

Stage 20
19 July 1985 — Montpon-Ménestérol to Limoges,

Stage 21
20 July 1985 — Lac de Vassivière,  (individual time trial)

Stage 22
21 July 1985 — Orléans to Paris Champs-Élysées,

References

1985 Tour de France
Tour de France stages